Ann-Janeth Rosendahl (born 20 July 1959) is a retired Swedish cross-country skier who competed in the early 1980s. She finished fifth in the 4 × 5 km relay at the 1984 Winter Olympics in Sarajevo.

Cross-country skiing results

Olympic Games

World Cup

Season standings

External links
Women's 4 x 5 kilometer cross-country relay Olympic results: 1976-2002 
Ann Rosendahl at Sports Reference

References

Cross-country skiers at the 1984 Winter Olympics
Living people
Swedish female cross-country skiers
1959 births
Sportspeople from Örebro
20th-century Swedish women